Serinicoccus profundi is a Gram-positive bacterium species from the genus Serinicoccus which has been isolated from deep-sea sediments from the Indian Ocean.

References 

Micrococcales
Bacteria described in 2011